Louis Lévy-Garboua (born 27 September 1945) is a French economist whose work focuses on behavioral economics and microeconomics. He is a distinguished professor at the University of Paris 1 Pantheon-Sorbonne and at the Paris School of Economics.

Biography
A former student of the École Polytechnique and the National School of Statistics and Economic Administration, Lévy-Garboua is a Doctor of State in Economics from the University of Paris 1 Pantheon-Sorbonne and Associate of Universities in France. Professor at the University of Paris I, Lévy-Garboua first taught microeconomics applied to public policies and social institutions, as well as the economy of uncertainty information and behavioral economics. He wrote his main works in the 1970s, including helping students in France: facts and criticism to the CNRS editions in 1977, and made important around the economics of education. He is the director of the research team associated with the CNRS. Applied Microeconomics (LAMIA), a unit also associated with the CNRS. Knight of the National Order of Merit in 1995, Lévy-Garboua is appointed expert of the Research Directorate of the Ministry of National Education. In the 2000s, he ensures the preparation of the aggregation course at the École normale supérieure of Cachan on human capital and several international universities, including the University of Montreal, as a guest and expert in microeconomics. Since 2000, Lévy-Garboua has been associated with CIRANO (Interuniversity Center for Research and Analysis of Organizations) in Montreal. He is also a member of the Scientific Council of the Observatory of Student Life (OVE), and principal organizer (with Christine Roland-Lévy) of the International Conference IAREP.

Research 
 2008 : Learning from Experience or Learning from Others? Inferring Informal Training from a Human Capital Earnings Function with Matched Employer-Employee Data (with G. Destré and M. Sollogoub), Journal of Socio-Economics.
 Aspiration Levels and Educational Choices : an Experimental Study, with Lionel Page and Claude Montmarquette (2006), published in Economics of Education Review 26, (2007), 747-757.
 A Behavioral Laffer Curve : Emergence of a Social Norm of Fairness in a Real Effort Experiment, with David Masclet and Claude Montmarquette, Journal of Economic Psychology, 30, (2009), 47-161.
 Learning from Experience or Learning from Others ? Inferring Informal Training from a Human Capital Earnings Function with Matched Employer-Employee Data, with Guillaume Destré and Michel Sollogoub, Journal of Socio-Economics 37, (2008), 919-938.
 Job Satisfaction and Quits, with Claude Montmarquette and Véronique Simonnet, Labour Economics 14 (2007), 251-268.
 The Formation of Social Preferences : Some Lessons from Psychology and Biology, with Claude Meidinger and Benoît Rapoport, in Handbook on the Economics of Giving, Altruism and Reciprocity, S.C. Kolm, and J. Mercier-Ythier (Eds.), Amsterdam : Elsevier (2006), 545-613.
 2006 : Aspiration Levels and Educational Choices : an Experimental Study (with L. Page and C. Montmarquette), Volume 26, Issue 6, Décembre 2007, Pages 747-757.
 2006 : Responsabilité individuelle et fiscalité (with C. Montmarquette and M.C. Villeval), Économie et Prévision, 2006, Aspiration Levels and Educational Choices : an Experimental Study (with L. Page and C. Montmarquette), Economics of Education Review.
 2005 : Fiscalité et offre de travail : une étude expérimentale (with D. Masclet and C. Montmarquette), Économie et Prévision.
 Preference Formation, School Dissatisfaction and Risky Behavior of Adolescents, with Youenn Lohéac and Bertrand Fayolle, Journal of Economic Psychology 27 (2006), 165-183.
 Reported Job Satisfaction : What Does it Mean?, with Claude Montmarquette, Journal of Socio-Economics 33 (2004), 135-151.
 Perception Séquentielle et Rationalité Limitée, (2003), published in Journal des Economistes et des Etudes Humaines 14 (2004), 63-77.
 An Economist's View of Schooling Systems, with Nathalie Damoiselet, Gérard Lassibille and Lucia Navarro-Gomez in Human Capital over the Life Cycle, C. Sofer (ed.), Cheltenham, UK: Edward Elgar, (2004), 53-68.
 On the Rationality of Cognitive Dissonance, with Serge Blondel in The Expansion of Economics : Towards an Inclusive Social Science, S. Grossbard-Schechtman et C. Clague (eds), MESharpe, Inc., (2002), 227-238.
 A Microeconometric Study of Theatre Demand, with Claude Montmarquette, Journal of Cultural Economics 20 (1996), 25–50.
 Cognition in Seemingly Riskless Choices and Judgments, with Claude Montmarquette, (1996), published in Rationality and Society 8 (1996), 167-185.
 Recherche sur les rendements de l'éducation en France, Paris, Édition CNRS, Col. A.T.P., n° 1, 1973.
 L'aide aux étudiants en France : faits et critique, Paris, Édition Economica, (with B. Lemennicier, B. Millot, F. Orivel), Édition CNRS, Col. A.T.P., n° 18, 1977.
 Sociological Economics, Londres, Édition Sage Pub, 1979.

Positions
 Founder and permanent member of the Organizing Committee for Applied Microeconomics Days since 1984.
 President of the "Association for Research in Applied Microeconomics" (ARMA) since 1989.
 Elected member of the Executive Board of the Society for the Advancement of Behavioral Economics (SABE) since 2000.
 Responsible for many research contracts:
 European Program TSER (network of 6 European research teams):  Schooling, Training, and Transitions, 1997-2002.
 Cognitive Program for the Ministry of Research: "Reasoning, Learning and Unconsciousness in Individual Decisions and Games", 2000-2002.
 Substance Abuse Program for Interministerial Mission against Drugs and Drug Addiction, MILDT, and National Institute of Health and Medical Research, INSERM:  Uses of psychotropic drugs by Adolescents: Social Interactions and Conduct at Risk, 2001-2004.
 ACI Education  Social Contexts, Institutional Contexts and Returns to Education Systems, 2004-2007.
 Pluri Formations Program,  Behavioral Economics and Economic Psychology, 2006-2009.
 Member of the Selection and Evaluation Committee for the Call for Tenders of the General Commissioner of the Plan on the Effectiveness of Public Expenditure (1997-1999), the Selection Committee of the [[Swiss National Science Foundation] scientific research]] (Social Status Issues) (1999), Canada Research Chairs Selection Committee (2000-), Evaluator of the Austrian Fund, the European Science Foundation, etc.
 Member of the Editorial Bureau of Higher Education Policy (since 1996), Educational Reasons (since 1998), Journal of Economists and Human Studies (since 1989), Understand (since 1999) and  Journal of Socio-Economics  (since 2006).
 Refereeed by several French and foreign scientific journals:  Revue Économique, Journal of Political Economy, Economics and Forecasting, Applied Economics, Ergonomic Research of Louvain, New Journal of Social Psychology, Journal of Public Economics, European Economic Review, Economics of Education Review, Journal of Population Economics, Journal of Economics of the Household, European Journal of Political Economy, Journal of Cultural Economics, Journal of Economic Behavior and Organization, Theory and Decision, Social Science Quarterly, Journal of Socio-Economics, Journal of Economic Psychology, etc.
 Member of  the French Association of Economic Sciences , the European Economic Association, the 'American Economic Association', the 'Society for the Advancement of Behavioral Economics', of the International Association for Research in Economic Psychology.

Awards 
 Prix de l'Association Française de science Économique décerné à la thèse de Louis Lévy-Garboua, 1973
 Chevalier de l'Ordre national du Mérite, 1995

References

External links 

 Louis Lévy-Garboua, personal page at the website of the Paris School of Economics.

1945 births
21st-century French  economists
20th-century French economists
Behavioral economists
Living people
Economics educators
Pantheon-Sorbonne University alumni
Academic staff of Pantheon-Sorbonne University